Lycée Jules Verne (LJV) is a French international school in South Africa. The main campus is in Sandton, Johannesburg, while the Pretoria Campus is in Arcadia, Pretoria. It is a part of the Agency for French Education Abroad (AEFE). It covers levels pre-primary until high school.

Maps

References

External links

 Lycée Jules Verne
  Lycée Jules Verne
 

French international schools in South Africa
International schools in Johannesburg
International schools in Pretoria
High schools in South Africa
Educational institutions with year of establishment missing